Netafim (נְטָפִים) is a Hebrew word, meaning "drops of water". It may refer to:
 Netafim, Israeli irrigation technologies company
 Netafim Border Crossing, between Israel and Egypt
 Kiryat Netafim, Israeli settlement in the West Bank
 Ein Netafim, water spring in the mountains of Eilat